The Jaruud (Khalkha-Mongolian:Жарууд/Jaruud; ; "The Sixties") are a Southern Mongol subgroup in Jarud Banner, China.

Linguist András Róna-Tas states that whether Jaruud in Inner Mongolia are related to the Khitans' ruling clan Yelü (Chinese: 耶律; Khitan: , spelled ei.ra.ú.ud, pronounced *Yärüd) should be further investigated.

See also 
 Yelü
 Administrative divisions of Northern Yuan Dynasty
 Demographics of China
 List of medieval Mongolian tribes and clans
 Southern Mongolian dialect

References

Mongols
Southern Mongols